Fasasi Mobolaji Gaius, known as Da Emperor, is a Nigerian indigenous rapper, actor, and songwriter. He has family roots in Ogun State, Nigeria. He raps in his native language, Yoruba, and infuses Pidgin and English. Da Emperor has recorded songs with artists such as  Gabriel Afolayan , Small Doctor, and Oritse Femi.

He released his second official single titled "Firewood", which features vocals from Oritse Femi. This was followed by the singles "Shake it" and "I'm a Sinner".

Da Emperor was awarded the position of Tourism Ambassador on September 3rd, 2021 by the Bauchi State Tourism Board.

Music career 
In 2013, he collaborated with Canadian-based Jamaican reggae artist Kisco. Da Emperor has recorded music with established and up-and-coming artists. He has shared the stage with Davido and Tiwa Savage. In February 2013, he was featured on the song "Be Ma Boo" by Afro-Pop singer Slim Joe. In 2013, he released the single "Para Mode" mixed by Indomix; its music video has surpassed 100,000 YouTube views and was released in 2014.

On 2 February 2014, he released a song in support of Governor Akinwunmi Ambode's campaign. It was succeeded by the single "Liar", a cover of Chris Brown's "Loyal" featuring Lil Wayne and Tyga.

In May 2015, he teamed up with Oritse Femi to release the hit song "Firewood" mixed by indomix. On 12 February 2016, he released the widely accepted single "I'm a Sinner". On 5 March 2016, Da Emperor was involved in an international collaboration with American artist Stylezz and English artist Shyboss

Just a few days after he jumped on Olamide's "who u epp" song, Da Emperor's version hit the number 4 spot on Spotify, of Nigerian rapper Olamide ever released songs.

Awards and nominations 

The Polytechnic Ibadan "Honorary Award"

! 
|-
|2015
|Da Emperor
|Distinguished Emerging Act of the Year
|
|

Nigeria Achievers Awards

! 
|-
|2016
|Da Emperor
|Next Rated Act (Music)
|
|

City People Entertainment Awards

! 
|-
|2016
|Da Emperor
|Rookie of the Year
|
|

Emperor Nollywood Award "Recognition Award"

! 
|-
|2017
|Da Emperor
|Special Artist Recognition
|
|

Olabisi Onabanjo University, National Association Of Architecture Students "Honorary Award"

! 
|-
|2017
|Da Emperor
|Musician Of The Year 
|
|

Discography

Videography

See also

List of Nigerian musicians

List of Nigerian rappers

References

External links 

1993 births
Living people
Nigerian songwriters
Rappers from Lagos
Nigerian male rappers
21st-century Nigerian male singers
Yoruba musicians
Yoruba-language singers
English-language singers from Nigeria